Chambers is the first and only studio album by the Japanese group Steady & Co.; released in 2001.

Track listing
"S・T・E・A・D・Y -intro-" – 1:22
"Chambers" – 3:58
"Kazemakase" (風まかせ) – 3:48
"Hip Drop" – 3:47
"Sorrow" – 5:16
"Shun-Ka-Shū-Tō" (春夏秋冬) – 4:20
"Time Erases Everything" – 4:27
"Jammed Train Blues -inter-" – 1:41
"Pass da Mic" – 3:37
"Wonderland" – 3:56
"Only Holy Story" (featuring azumi from wyolica) – 5:10
"Up and Down" – 4:16
"Gekkoyoku" (月光浴) – 3:36
"Stay Gold" – 4:56
"After Hours -outro-" – 1:31

Steady & Co. albums
2001 debut albums